Frehn Bridge, also known as Huntingdon County Bridge No. 1, was a historic Pratt truss bridge spanning Sideling Hill Creek and located at Springfield Township, Huntingdon County, Pennsylvania.  It was built in 1890, and measured  in length and had a  timber deck.

It was added to the National Register of Historic Places in 1990.

The bridge has been demolished and replaced with a modern structure.

References

External links
 HAER Engineering in Huntingdon County

Road bridges on the National Register of Historic Places in Pennsylvania
Bridges completed in 1890
Bridges in Huntingdon County, Pennsylvania
National Register of Historic Places in Huntingdon County, Pennsylvania
Pratt truss bridges in the United States
Metal bridges in the United States